Brigadier Francis Bede Heritage,  (21 September 1877 – 9 July 1934) was an Australian soldier who served during the Second Boer War and First World War.

Francis was the eldest son of George Thomas Henry Heritage, teacher and soldier, and his wife Eleanor Boyce,  Hadfield.

During the Second Boer War, he was an officer of the 1st Australian Regiment, and later commanded the Tasmanian contingent. Heritage was a commandant several times of the Royal Military College, Duntroon.

References

Further reading
C. H. Finlay, 'Heritage, Francis Bede (1877–1934)', Australian Dictionary of Biography, National Centre of Biography, Australian National University, 1983.

1877 births
1934 deaths
Australian brigadiers